Pomian may refer to:
Pomian coat of arms
Pomian, Masovian Voivodeship (east-central Poland)
 Krzysztof Pomian (born 1934), a Polish philosopher, historian and essayist